Cannibal Holocaust is the second EP by the death metal band Necrophagia. It was released in October 22, 2001 on the Season of Mist label. It is the band's first release with Opal Enthroned. Both the EP and the first song are named after the 1980 film with the same name. The music video of the song features clips from the film.

Track listing

Personnel
Killjoy – vocals
Anton Crowley – guitars
Wayne Fabra – drums
Jared Faulk – bass guitar
Frediablo – guitars
Opal Enthroned – keyboards

2001 EPs
Necrophagia albums
Season of Mist albums